The Obârșia is a right tributary of the river Crușov in Romania. It flows into the Crușov near Tia Mare.

References

Rivers of Romania
Rivers of Olt County